Digallane (systematically named digallane(6)) is an inorganic compound with the chemical formula  (also written  or ). It is the dimer of the monomeric compound gallane. The eventual preparation of the pure compound, reported in 1989,
was hailed as a "tour de force." Digallane had been reported as early as 1941 by Wiberg; however, this claim could not be verified by later work by Greenwood and others. This compound is a colorless gas that decomposes above 0 °C.

Preparation
A two-stage approach proved to be the key to successful synthesis of pure digallane. Firstly the dimeric monochlorogallane, (H2GaCl)2 (containing bridging chlorine atoms and thus formulated as (H2Ga(μ-Cl))2) was prepared via the hydrogenation of gallium trichloride, GaCl3, with Me3SiH. This step was followed by a further reduction with LiGaH4, solvent free, at −23 °C, to produce digallane, Ga2H6 in low yield.

Ga2Cl6 + 4 Me3SiH  → (H2GaCl)2 + 4 Me3SiCl
1/2 (H2GaCl)2 + LiGaH4 → Ga2H6 + LiCl

Digallane is volatile and condenses at −50 °C into a white solid.

Structure and bonding
Electron diffraction measurements of the vapour at 255 K established that digallane is structurally similar to diborane with 2 bridging hydrogen atoms (so-called three-center two-electron bonds).  The terminal Ga—H bond length is 152 pm, the Ga—H bridging is 171 pm and the Ga—H—Ga angle is 98°. The Ga—Ga distance is 258 pm. The 1H NMR spectrum of a solution of digallane in toluene shows two peaks attributable to terminal and bridging hydrogen atoms.

In the solid state, digallane appears to adopt a polymeric or oligomeric structure. The vibrational spectrum is consistent with tetramer (i.e. (GaH3)4). The vibrational data indicate the presence of terminal hydride ligands. In contrast, the hydrogen atoms are all bridging in α-alane, a high-melting, relatively stable polymeric form of aluminium hydride wherein the aluminium centers are 6-coordinated. Digallane decomposes at ambient temperatures:
 Ga2H6 → 2 Ga + 3 H2

References

Inorganic compounds
Gallium compounds
Metal hydrides
Reducing agents
Substances discovered in the 1980s